This is the discography for American hip hop/pop musician Jake Miller.

Studio albums

Extended plays

Singles

Featured singles

Non-album singles

References

Discographies of American artists
Hip hop discographies
Pop music discographies